Narynkol (Narynqol) - A village in Raiymbek District of Almaty Region of Kazakhstan. It is the administrative center of Narynkol rural district. Located near the border with China, about 82 km east-south-east (ESE) from Kegen, the administrative center of Raiymbek District, at an altitude of 1801 meters above sea level

Population 
In 1999, the village had a population of 8816 people (4371 men and 4445 women). [3] According to the 2009 census, the village population of 7731 people (3806 men and 3925 women)

Economy 
It is the number one producer of livestock and crop production in its agricultural area. The village pasture is filled with large grasslands, which is one of the main reasons for their success. The resulting animal products are the main source of livelihood of the population. Potatoes also make up a large portion of the Narynkoler economy.

In 1992, the Narynkol–Muzart border crossing with China was temporarily opened. It was hoped a highway would be built over the Muzart Pass (Xiate Trail), allowing this port to connect Kazakhstan with Tarim Basin. However, that never happened. Thus crossing was closed as it lacked traffic.

Famous People 
 Muqagali Maqataev
 Berdibek Sokpakbaev
 Altinbek Carsenbayuli
 Sagat Aşimbaev
 Erkin Ibitanov
 Zamanbek Nurqadilov
 Beybit Daldenbaev
 Toqqoja Muqaev
 Nurbapa Omirzaqov
 Edige Zharov
 Alkinov Papadopuvski

References 

Populated places in Almaty Region